In older sources, "black-throated tit" can also mean the rufous-naped tit or the rufous-vented tit, which are true tits.

The black-throated bushtit (Aegithalos concinnus), also known as the black-throated tit, is a very small passerine bird in the family Aegithalidae.

Taxonomy
The species has six currently recognised subspecies, and several others have been suggested. Genetic studies have suggested that these subspecies may represent separate species, but further research is needed.

Description
The black-throated bushtit is a small passerine, around 10.5 cm long and weighing 4-9 g. There is considerable racial variation in the plumage, but all subspecies have a medium length tail (as opposed to the long tail of the related long-tailed tit), a black throat and a black 'bandit mask' around the eye. The nominate race has a chestnut cap, breast band and flanks and dark grey back, wings and tail, and a white belly. The other subspecies have generally the same pattern (minus the chest band) but with grey caps or all grey bellies and flanks. Both sexes are alike.

Distribution and habitat
It ranges from the foothills of the Himalayas, stretching across northern India through north-eastern Bangladesh, Nepal, Bhutan, northern Myanmar, Vietnam, and Taiwan. Disjunct populations also occur in southern Vietnam, the island of Hainan and further north in China up to the Yellow River. It lives in open broadleaf forest as well as pine forest, generally occurring in middle altitudes.

Behaviour
The black-throated bushtit is highly social and will travel in large flocks of up to 40 birds.

Breeding
The nest is constructed out of moss and lichen and hangs from the branches of trees.

Feeding
The species feeds on small insects and spiders, as well as small seeds, fruits and berries (particularly raspberries). Group numbers swell during the non-breeding season, but smaller groups exist year round. These groups will often join mixed-species feeding flocks.

Gallery

References

black-throated bushtit
Birds of China
Birds of the Himalayas
Birds of Northeast India
Birds of Myanmar
Birds of Laos
Birds of Vietnam
Birds of Yunnan
black-throated bushtit
black-throated bushtit